Milt Goldstein or "Milton Goldstein"  (born August 1, 1926) is an American executive in the Motion Picture Industry.

Early life
Goldstein was born in New York City, New York, and was educated at New York University, 1949.

Career
Goldstein worked as an executive at Paramount.  He was foreign sales coordinator for the movies The Ten Commandments and Psycho. He was Vice President of foreign sales at Samuel Bronston Org,  Assistant to the President of Paramount International Special Productions in 1964, and Foreign Sales Manager in 1966. He became VP of World Wide Sales in 1967 of Cinerama, and  Senior VP of Cinema Center Films in 1969.

In 1971 Goldstein was president  of Cinema Center Films, and VP of Theatrical Marketing & Sales of Metromedia Producers Corp in 1973. He was presented with a Johann awards for his success in marketing Columbia Masterworks products.

Goldstein formed Boasberg-Goldstein in March 1974 as a consultant in production and distribution of motion pictures. He was named Executive VP of Avco Embassy Pictures in 1975, Executive VP & CEO of Melvin Simon Productions in 1978 and president in 1980, and CEO of Simon/Reeves/Landburg.

Goldstein was president of Milt Goldstein Enterprises Inc. in 1985, and Chairman and CEO of HKM Films in 1990. He was President of Introvision movies in 1991.

Goldstein acted as Executive Producer of Captive Hearts 1987 and Porky's 3 Revenge 1985. Played Bernie in Reckless Kelly 1993.

See also 
 Captive Hearts (film)

References 

 Television & Video Almanac QP 1994 3rd Edition
 
 
 
 

1926 births
Possibly living people
American film studio executives
American Jews
Businesspeople from New York City
New York University alumni